A Bag Full of Blues is an album by American jazz organist Jimmy McGriff featuring performances recorded in 1967 and originally released on the Solid State label.

Reception
AllMusic gave the album 3 stars.

Track listing
All compositions by Manny Albam
 "Better Late Than Never" - 4:50
 "Finishin'" - 3:23
 "Slim Jim" - 5:35
 "Time Waltzes On" - 6:00
 "The Long Day's Night" - 4:23 
 "The Long Hot Walk" - 5:14
 "The Deacon's Peekin'" - 4:20
 "Friday Nite's Rite" - 5:20

Personnel
Jimmy McGriff - organ
Joe Newman - trumpet
Jerome Richardson - tenor saxophone, soprano saxophone
Barry Galbraith, Wally Richardson - guitar
Richard Davis - bass
Mel Lewis - drums
Manny Albam - arranger, conductor

References

Solid State Records (jazz label) albums
Jimmy McGriff albums
1967 albums
Albums produced by Sonny Lester
Albums arranged by Manny Albam
Albums conducted by Manny Albam